The Desired Effect is the second studio album by American singer-songwriter and The Killers frontman Brandon Flowers. It was released on May 15, 2015, by Island Records. It was produced by Ariel Rechtshaid and Flowers and mixed by Alan Moulder. The album debuted at number one on the UK Albums Chart, becoming Flowers' second solo number-one album and sixth overall.

Background
In 2010, Flowers released his debut solo album Flamingo under the production work of Daniel Lanois, Stuart Price, and Brendan O'Brien. Flamingo, a homage to Flowers' hometown of Las Vegas, topped the UK Albums Chart and included a top-10 single on the UK Singles Chart. Flowers toured internationally in support of the album, receiving rave reviews for his live performances. Flowers then put his solo career on hiatus while he pursued collaborations with The Killers including the UK number-one album Battle Born.

In February 2015, Flowers released a teaser video on his website as well as a hand written note stating, "May 18, 2015 We will finally achieve The Desired Effect. Ariel and I have been collaborating in the studio, working together in the spirit of conversation, contention, and at long last, Sweet contrition. No one has yet seen or heard the change. But soon, we all will."

Recording
The Desired Effect was recorded primarily at The Killers' studio, Battle Born Studios in Winchester, Nevada. The album was produced by Ariel Rechtshaid and mixed by Alan Moulder. The album features notable musicians including Neil Tennant (Pet Shop Boys), Bruce Hornsby, Tony Levin (Peter Gabriel), Carlos Alomar (David Bowie), Joey Waronker (Beck), Kenny Aronoff (John Mellencamp), Ronnie Vannucci, Jr. (The Killers), Angel Deradoorian (Dirty Projectors), and Danielle Haim (Haim).

Promotion
"Can't Deny My Love" was released as the lead single on March 23, 2015. It also served as an instant download for pre-orders of the album. Flowers released a series of promotional video clips announcing the single. Flowers also released a series of promotional video clips announcing second single "Still Want You".  He released the music video exclusively on Vessel.com A lyric video was released for "I Can Change".

Flowers performed "Can't Deny My Love" on The Tonight Show Starring Jimmy Fallon on March 23, 2015. He performed both "Can't Deny My Love" and "Lonely Town" on Jimmy Kimmel Live! on May 7. On May 13, he appeared on The Late Late Show with James Corden to perform "Lonely Town". Two days later, on May 15, Flowers performed "I Can Change" on The Graham Norton Show. On May 20, Flowers performed a set at Maida Vale Studios on BBC Radio 2 Live Session with Jo Whiley; The Desired Effect was featured the record of the week (May 9) Flowers performed "Can't Deny My Love", "Lonely Town", and "Still Want You" on DirecTV's Guitar Center Sessions on May 29, hosted by Nic Harcourt. He performed "Still Want You" on the Strictly Come Dancing results show on November 15.

In March 2015, Flowers announced a European leg of The Desired Effect Tour in promotion of the album. The leg began in Dublin, Ireland on May 19, and moved onto the UK starting in London on May 21. On tour Flowers was joined by guests on stage including Chrissie Hynde of The Pretenders and Bernard Sumner of New Order. In April 2015, Flowers announced a North American solo tour, which ran from July 27 through October 1. He also performed at the Austin City Limits Music Festival and at Life Is Beautiful.

Critical reception

The Desired Effect received critical acclaim from music critics. At Metacritic, which assigns a normalized rating out of 100 to reviews from mainstream critics, the album received an average score of 75, based on 25 reviews. Matt Yates of Q wrote, "Big, bold and joyful, it's exactly what a great pop album should be." Neil McCormick of The Sunday Telegraph called it a "set of perfectly honed pop-rock burnished with immense choruses" and wrote that, "every track offers up a smart blend of snappy lyrics and catchy hooks." Mark Beaumont of NME wrote, "The Desired Effect is a consistently impressive collection." Sarah Jamieson of DIY wrote "Brandon is still very much the star of this show... he's always been at his most comfortable creating huge pop songs and with his last solo effort, he proved to do just that."

Andy Gill of The Independent called it "a series of huge-sounding, stadium-ready pop anthems of undeniable charm." Lewis Corner of Digital Spy called it, "an astute and vivid record." Sarah Rodman of The Boston Globe wrote, "The other predicted effect of the album? A desire to play it repeatedly." Darryl Sterdan of The Observer wrote, "Worth your time." Rob Sheffield of Rolling Stone wrote, "The Desired Effect is something rare—the best straight-up pop album made by a rock star in recent memory."

The album won the 2015 AML Award in the "Lyrics" category.

Accolades

Commercial performance
The Desired Effect debuted at number one on the UK Albums Chart with first week sales of 31,077 copies, making it Flowers' second solo number-one album and sixth overall, including work by the Killers. In the United States, the album sold the seventh most copies its debut week, but due to the inclusion of streaming data, it charted at number 17. At the mid-year mark, the album was the 38th best-selling album of the year in the UK.

Single "I Can Change" charted on the UK Singles and Irish Singles charts. Singles "Can't Deny My Love" and "Lonely Town" charted on the US Hot Rock Songs chart. The album was certified Gold by the BPI in April 2017.

Track listing
All tracks produced by Ariel Rechtshaid, except "The Way It's Always Been" produced by Brandon Flowers and "Between Me and You" produced by Robert Root.

Sample credits
 "I Can Change" contains an interpolation from "Smalltown Boy" (1984), as performed by Bronski Beat.

Personnel
Credits adapted from the liner notes of The Desired Effect.

Musicians

 Brandon Flowers – lead vocals, synthesizers ; guitar ; piano ; drum programming 
 Ariel Rechtshaid – programming, synthesizers ; bass ; guitar ; drum programming ; string arrangement, brass arrangement ; percussion 
 Roger Manning Jr. – synthesizers ; clavinet 
 Benji Lysaght – guitar ; acoustic guitar 
 Carlos Alomar – guitar 
 Joey Waronker – drums ; percussion 
 Angel Deradoorian – background vocals 
 Moonlight Tran – cello 
 Lauren Cordell – violin 
 Tommy King – keyboards ; piano 
 Ethan Farmer – bass 
 Greg Leisz – pedal steel ; banjo 
 Sheree Brown – additional background vocals ; background vocals 
 Jackie Gouche – additional background vocals ; background vocals 
 Akasha Mabry Hendrix – additional background vocals ; background vocals 
 Lynn Mabry – additional background vocals ; background vocals 
 Nate Donmoyer – drum programming, synthesizers 
 Ted Sablay – acoustic guitar ; bass 
 Danielle Withers – background vocals 
 Erica Canales – background vocals 
 Neil Tennant – additional vocals 
 Jake Blanton – bass ; background vocals ; Hammond B-3 
 Darren Beckett – vibraphone ; drums 
 Jamie Muhoberac – synthesizers 
 Jason Hill – synthesizers 
 Bruce Hornsby – piano 
 Tony Levin – bass, Chapman Stick 
 Danielle Haim – drums 
 Jeff Driskill – saxophone 
 Robert Hardt – saxophone 
 Eddie Rich – saxophone 
 Isaac Tubb – trumpet 
 Ron Blake aka Ronnie Blake – trumpet, flugelhorn 
 Stephen Giraldo – trumpet, flugelhorn 
 Francisco Torres – trombone, bass trombone 
 Kenny Aronoff – drums 
 Matt Breunig – guitar ; 12-string guitar 
 Rick Nowels – piano, Mellotron, bells 
 Ronnie Vannucci Jr. – drums

Technical

 Ariel Rechtshaid – production, engineering ; mixing 
 Brandon Flowers – production 
 Matt Breunig – engineering 
 Robert Root – engineering ; mixing 
 Dave Schiffman – engineering 
 Nick Rowe – additional engineering 
 Michael Harris – engineering assistance ; engineering assistance 
 Christopher Cerullo – studio assistance 
 John DeBold – studio assistance ; engineering assistance 
 Alan Moulder – mixing 
 Caesar Edmunds – mix engineering assistance 
 Tony Maserati – mixing 
 Tyler Scott – mix engineering assistance 
 Jason Hill – engineering 
 Kevin Killen – mixing 
 Dave Fridmann – mixing 
 Michael Fridmann – mix engineering assistance 
 John Spiker – additional engineering 
 Stuart Price – engineering 
 Emily Lazar – mastering
 Chris Allgood – mastering assistance

Artwork
 Warren Fu – creative direction, design
 Todd Russell – design
 Williams + Hirakawa – photography

Charts

Weekly charts

Year-end charts

Certifications

Release history

Notes

References

2015 albums
Albums produced by Ariel Rechtshaid
Brandon Flowers albums
Island Records albums
Albums recorded at Electro-Vox Recording Studios